Academy of Natural Sciences founded in Philadelphia. It  is the first natural science research institution and museum in the New World. 
Samuel Thomas von Sömmerring describes Ornithocephalus antiquus now known as Pterodactylus.The animal was described as being both a mammal, a bat, and a form in between mammals and birds. George Cuvier and provided a lengthy description in which he restated his previous view that the fossil animal was a reptile.

Ongoing events
George Shaw General Zoology, or Systematic Natural History (1809-1826) Species described in this work in 1812 include blue-tufted starthroat, red-tailed comet, greater vasa parrot, copper sunbird,  glittering-bellied emerald and purple-banded sunbird.
Alexander Wilson Ornithology of America (1808–1814) Species described in this work in 1812  include fish crow, whip-poor-will and Connecticut warbler

Birding and ornithology by year
1812 in science